Rodrigo Sebastián Aguirre Soto (born 1 October 1994) is a Uruguayan professional footballer who plays as a striker for Liga MX club Monterrey.

Career
Aguirre began his career with Liverpool in Montevideo. While at the club he scored 16 goals in 57 matches. He was loaned to the newly promoted Serie A team Empoli on 3 July 2014, then went to play in the lower leagues.
He was loaned again to Serie B team Perugia on 1 February 2016.

On 4 February 2019, he signed a 3-year contract with Ecuadorian club L.D.U. Quito.

On 20 January 2021, he signed with Liga MX side, Club Necaxa.

International career

Under-17
During 2011, Rodrigo played with the under-17 side at the 2011 FIFA U-17 World Cup in Mexico. Previously, he played the 2011 South American Under-17 Football Championship in Ecuador.

Honours
Botafogo
 Campeonato Carioca: 2018

Liga de Quito
 Copa Ecuador: 2019
 Supercopa Ecuador: 2020

Uruguay U17
 2011 FIFA U-17 World Cup: Runner-Up
 2011 South American Under-17 Football Championship: Runner-Up

References

External links
 Profile at soccerway

1994 births
Living people
Uruguayan footballers
Uruguay under-20 international footballers
Uruguayan expatriate footballers
Association football forwards
Uruguayan Primera División players
Serie A players
Serie B players
Liverpool F.C. (Montevideo) players
Udinese Calcio players
Empoli F.C. players
A.C. Perugia Calcio players
FC Lugano players
Club Nacional de Football players
Botafogo de Futebol e Regatas players
L.D.U. Quito footballers
Club Necaxa footballers
Expatriate footballers in Italy
Uruguayan expatriate sportspeople in Italy
Expatriate footballers in Switzerland
Uruguayan expatriate sportspeople in Switzerland
Expatriate footballers in Brazil
Uruguayan expatriate sportspeople in Brazil
Expatriate footballers in Ecuador
Uruguayan expatriate sportspeople in Ecuador
Ecuadorian Serie A players
Footballers from Montevideo